|}

The Chalice Stakes is a Listed flat horse race in Great Britain open to mares and fillies aged three years or older.
It is run at Newmarket over a distance of 1 mile and 4 furlongs (2,414 metres), and it is scheduled to take place each year in August.

The race was first run in 2000.

Between 2000 and 2014 the race was run at Newbury before moving to Newmarket in 2015.

Records

Most successful horse (2 wins):
Love Everlasting (2001, 2002)

Leading jockey (3 wins):
Andrea Atzeni – Ambivalent (2012), Silk Sari (2014), Emotion (2022)

Leading trainer (3 wins):
Mark Johnston – Love Everlasting (2001, 2002), Fireglow (2016)
 John Gosden -  Gretchen (2015), To Eternity (2017), Emotion (2022)

Winners

See also
 Horse racing in Great Britain
 List of British flat horse races

References 
Racing Post: 

Flat races in Great Britain
Newmarket Racecourse
Long-distance horse races for fillies and mares
Recurring sporting events established in 2000
2000 establishments in England